Native is a 2016 British sci-fi film directed by Daniel Fitzsimmons, written by Fitzsimmons and Neil Atkinson and starring Rupert Graves and Ellie Kendrick.

Plot

Two pilots are sent on a long distance flight through space; they are responding to a transmission from a far away galaxy. Throughout the journey they will struggle; for one of the pilots will experience the human condition, though they seem not actually to be human. Suffering a loss, one of the pilots will lose touch with the reality he has always known. He must face this new reality.

Cast
 Rupert Graves as Cane.
 Ellie Kendrick as Eva.
 Leanne Best, Joe McAuley, 
 Pollyanna McIntosh, 
 Daniel Brocklebank,
 Ian Hart, 
 Chiara D'Anna

Reviews
Native holds a 43% rating on Rotten Tomatoes based on 7 reviews, with an average rating of 5.1/10.

The film is described as "smart" and "elegant" by Peter Bradshaw in the Guardian. Kim Newman in Empire magazine describes it as "ambitious, unusual and thought-provoking". In The Times Ed Potton calls it a “script full of promise, with provocative things to say about empathy, obedience and individualism”.

Production
Shot predominantly in Dagenham and Formby Beach in Liverpool in 2014, co-writer and co-producer Atkinson said in an interview with the Liverpool Echo: “Everyone at Formby beach was helpful. Dogwalkers gave us a wide berth but the problem was the tide – we had a ticking clock and finished filming with the water up to our director of photography’s knees.”

Awards
The film won the feature film award at the 2016 Boston Science Fiction Film Festival. It was nominated for best film and director at the 2016 Bogotá Film Festival.

References

External links
 

British science fiction films
2016 films
2010s British films